Part of Me (Spanish: En otra piel) is a Spanish-language telenovela produced by United States and México-based television network Telemundo Studios, Miami. It is based on the 2005 Telemundo telenovela El Cuerpo del Deseo, which in turn is based on the 1992 RTI Colombia telenovela En Cuerpo Ajeno. María Elisa Camargo and David Chocarro stars as the main protagonists, while Vanessa Villela and Jorge Luis Pila stars as the main antagonists, with the special participation of Laura Flores.

As part of the 2014 season, Telemundo is broadcasting En otra piel weeknights at 9pm/8c as of February 18, 2014, replacing La Reina del Sur. As with most of its other telenovelas, the network is broadcasting English subtitles as closed captions on CC3.

En otra piel marks the debut of Flores with Telemundo, and the return of Camargo from Flor Salvaje and Villela from Una Maid en Manhattan. Also part of the cast are Pila and Chocarro after their respective hit telenovelas (La Patrona and El Rostro de la Venganza.)</onlyinclude>

Background 
The telenovela, based on the story El cuerpo del deseo by Julio Jiménez, was adapted for Telemundo by Laura Sousa and Eduardo Macías. It started life with the name "Almas pérdidas", but was later renamed "En otra piel".

Plot 
Two women share a tragic and supernatural destiny that binds them together even after death. Monica Serrano (Laura Flores), a world-renowned pianist with an impressive fortune, dies after the betrayal of her ambitious niece and the man she loves. But by way of a mysterious talisman, Monica's soul, which does not accept departing from this world, occupies the body of Adriana Aguilar (María Elisa Camargo), a modest waitress that dies at the hands of a dangerous gangster. Now, in Adriana's body, Monica's soul will do the impossible to defend her children and seek justice while Adriana's soul wanders this world. Motivated by love, Adriana decides to recover her body, but Monica will resist this until her mission has been completed. She wants to take revenge.

Cast

Main 
 María Elisa Camargo as Adriana Águilar / Mónica Serrano / Mónica Arriaga
 Jorge Luis Pila as Gerardo Fonsi
 David Chocarro as Diego Ochoa
 Vanessa Villela as Elena Serrano
 Laura Flores as Mónica Serrano
 Plutarco Haza as Carlos Ricalde / Raúl Camacho
 Maricella González as Selma Carrasco
 Guillermo Quintanilla	as Rodrigo Cantú
 Gloria Peralta as Marta Suárez
 Javier Gómez as Julián Larrea / Jorge Larrea
 Karen Senties as Lorena Serrano
 Beatriz Monroy as Victoria "Vicky" Andrade
 Eduardo Ibarrola as Judge Manuel Figueroa
 Kendra Santacruz as Camila Serrano
 Martín Barba as Ricardo Cantú
 Omar Germenos as Esteban Lazo
 Silvana Arias as Maite Carvajal
 Adrián Carvajal as Ernesto Fonsi / Ernesto Suárez
 Alexandra Pomales as Valeria Martínez
 Alba Raquel Barros as Guadalupe Cortes "Doña Lupe"
 Jonathan Freudman as Gabriel Cantú
 Óscar Priego as Jacinto Aguilar
 María Elena Dávila as Jennifer
 Juanita Arias as Eileen Parker
 Daniela Macías as Susana
 Gala Montes as Emiliana Larrea Serrano

Recurring 
 Rubén Morales as Don Mario "El Corleone"
 Gustavo Pedraza as Jaime González "Rottweiler"
 Yamil Sesin as Fulgencio Soto "El Pachuco"
 Juan Jiménez as Anselmo

Guests 
Francisco Bolívar as Emiliana Larrea Serrano (Green Death)

Soundtrack

United States broadcast

Awards and nominations

See also
List of Telemundo telenovelas

References

External links
 

American television series based on telenovelas
Telemundo telenovelas
2014 telenovelas
2014 American television series debuts
Spanish-language American telenovelas
2014 American television series endings
American television series based on Colombian television series